Chinandega is a department in Nicaragua, located on the border with Honduras. It covers an area of 4,822 km2 and has a population of 441,897 (2021 estimate). The capital is the city of Chinandega.

Largely agricultural, it produces rum from sugar cane; other products are bananas, peanuts, shrimp and salt.

The port of Corinto, in Chinandega, is the most important in Western Nicaragua.

Municipalities 
 Chichigalpa
 Chinandega
 Corinto
 El Realejo
 El Viejo
 Posoltega
 Puerto Morazán
 San Francisco del Norte
 San Juan de Cinco Pinos
 San Pedro del Norte
 Santo Tomás del Norte
 Somotillo
 Villanueva

References 

 
Departments of Nicaragua